Where Do We Go from Here? is a 1945 romantic musical comedy-fantasy film directed by Gregory Ratoff and starring Fred MacMurray, Joan Leslie, June Haver, Gene Sheldon, Anthony Quinn and Fortunio Bonanova. It was produced by Twentieth Century-Fox. Joan Leslie's singing voice was dubbed by Sally Sweetland.

The score was composed by Kurt Weill with lyrics by Ira Gershwin. Gregory Ratoff directed and Morrie Ryskind wrote the screenplay from a story by Sig Herzig and Ryskind.

The film is notable as Weill's only musical written directly for the screen and for its anachronistic blend of history and contemporary (1940s) slang. At the time, the mock-operatic sequence, "The Nina, the Pinta, the Santa Maria," was one of the longest musical sequences ever created for a screen musical.

Plot
Bill Morgan is a young American who is eager to join the military and fight for his country during World War II, but his 4F status prevents him from enlisting. Bill does his bit for the war effort by collecting scrap metal. Among the discarded junk he discovers a mysterious brass bottle which he rubs to clean off the grime.

Suddenly, Ali, a Genie, appears and offers to grant him three wishes. Without thinking, Bill says he wants to be in the US army. In a puff of smoke, Bill finds himself a foot soldier in George Washington's Continental Army during the American Revolutionary War. After a run-in with some Hessian soldiers, Bill escapes by wishing himself into the Navy. Once again the Genie transfers him, but this time to the crew of Christopher Columbus's ship on his maiden voyage to the new world. Once on shore, he agrees to buy Manhattan Island from a local native.

Bill next finds himself whisked forward in time to New Amsterdam in the mid-17th century. When he claims that he owns the Island, he is thrown in jail. Ali finally gets it right and Bill finds himself in the right time and place by the end of the film.

Cast
 Fred MacMurray as Bill Morgan
 Joan Leslie as Sally Smith / Prudence / Katrina
 June Haver as Lucilla Powell / Gretchen / Indian
 Gene Sheldon as Ali the Genie
 Anthony Quinn as Chief Badger
 Carlos Ramírez as Benito
 Alan Mowbray as General George Washington
 Fortunio Bonanova as Christopher Columbus
 Herman Bing as Hessian Col. / Von Heisel
 Howard Freeman as Kreiger

Production
Kurt Weill had not been well served by Hollywood. His scores for the Broadway shows Knickerbocker Holiday, Lady in the Dark, and One Touch of Venus had been drastically cut for their film adaptations. Although a few cuts were made in his proposed score for Where Do We Go from Here, most of his work with Ira Gershwin remains, including a lengthy mock-opera bouffé aboard Columbus' ship during which the crew threatens to mutiny.

Co-stars June Haver and Fred MacMurray met while working on this film, and were later married.
 
Where Do We Go from Here? has to date not been released on any traditional home video format. For years the only release was a recording taken directly from the soundtrack of the film, issued on LP (Ariel KWH 10) and a set of rehearsal recordings performed by Kurt Weill and Ira Gershwin is currently available on the CD Tryout (DRG Records) including extended versions of the songs "Nina, the Pinta, the Santa Maria", "Song of the Rhineland", and "Manhattan (Indian Song)."

A Manufactured-on-Demand-DVD was released through the Fox Archive MOD program in 2012.

Musical numbers
 All at Once – Sung by Fred MacMurray
 Morale – Sung and Danced by June Haver and Chorus
 If Love Remains – Sung and Danced by Fred MacMurray, Joan Leslie (dubbed by Sally Sweetland) and Chorus
 Song of the Rhineland – Sung and Danced by June Haver, Herman Bing and Chorus
 Columbus (The Nina, the Pinta, the Santa Maria) – Sung by Carlos Ramírez, Fred MacMurray, Fortunio Bonanova and Chorus
 All at Once (reprise) – Sung by Fred MacMurray and Joan Leslie (dubbed by Sally Sweetland)
 Morale (reprise) – Sung by Fred MacMurray, Joan Leslie (dubbed by Sally Sweetland), June Haver, Gene Sheldon and Chorus

Cut songs
 It Could Have Happened to Anyone
 Woo, Woo, Woo, Woo, Manhattan

See also
 List of films about the American Revolution
 List of television series and miniseries about the American Revolution

References

External links
 Where Do We Go From Here? at IMDB
 Where Do We Go from Here? at Turner Classic Movies
 
 
 Where Do We Go from Here? review in The New York Times
 Where Do We Go from Here? at Kurt Weill Foundation

1945 films
20th Century Fox films
Films directed by Gregory Ratoff
1940s musical fantasy films
World War II films made in wartime
Films about time travel
American black-and-white films
American musical fantasy films
Genies in film
Films produced by William Perlberg
1940s English-language films